"Guilty People" is a song by Margaret Urlich. The single was released in February 1991 as the fourth and final single from her debut and New Zealand Music Awards and ARIA award-winning studio album, Safety in Numbers (1989). The song features on her 1994 live album Live.

Track listing 
CD single/7" (CBS 656627 7)
 "Guilty People" (Maera Mix) – 4:56
 "Give Me Some Credit" – 5:41

Charts

References 

1989 songs
1991 singles
Margaret Urlich songs
CBS Records singles
Songs written by Barry Blue
Songs written by Robyn Smith (record producer)